Robert Albert Murphy (born May 26, 1960) is an American former professional baseball player who was a relief pitcher in Major League Baseball from 1985-1995.  Murphy played college baseball for the University of Florida, and was picked by the Cincinnati Reds in the first round (3rd pick) of the 1981 amateur draft (January Secondary).  In addition to the Reds, he played for the Boston Red Sox, Seattle Mariners, Houston Astros, St. Louis Cardinals, New York Yankees, Los Angeles Dodgers and Florida Marlins.

Early years 

Murphy was born in Miami, Florida.

He attended Christopher Columbus High School in Miami from 1974 to 1978. He pitched for the varsity baseball team in 1977 and 1978. The 1977 team won the District championship with his 4-hit shutout. He garnered many awards including: Pre-season 1st team All American, 1st team All City, and 1st team All Catholic. Murphy's American Legion team, Post 133, won its District Championship in 1976 with Murphy's 11 strikeout performance. 

After setting school records for most wins (17) and strikeouts (207), he was drafted by the Milwaukee Brewers in the 29th round.

Murphy also earned many accolades playing on the football field.  For the CCHS Explorers' football team, Murphy was named to the 1976 All Catholic team, and 3rd team All County Team. In 1977, he was first-team All-Catholic, and second-team All-Dade County. By the time Murphy put away his kicking tee, he was Columbus High's All-time leading scorer on the gridiron.

Recently, Murphy was the first baseball player inducted into CCHS Baseball Diamond Hall of Fame, along with Louisiana State baseball coach Paul Mainieri, and former Chicago Cubs general manager Jim Hendry. In 2009, Murphy was inducted into CCHS General Hall of Fame.

College career 

Instead of pursuing a professional baseball, Murphy accepted an athletic scholarship to attend the University of Florida in Gainesville, Florida, where he played for the Gators and advanced his computer science knowledge.  As a freshman, Murphy led the Gators in ERA (2.53), and was named the Rookie of the Year.  During his sophomore year, Murphy's 3-hit shutout over Tennessee secured the Gators' second consecutive SEC Eastern Division title, while also becoming the first Gator baseball team to win 40 regular season games. His career record was 6-3 while pitching in orange and blue.  After his days in Gainesville, Murphy was drafted by Cincinnati Reds in the 1st round, as the third overall draft pick.  He was only the 2nd Gator ever selected in the 1st round of the Major League draft.

Professional career 
Cincinnati Reds Minor League System 1981 - 1985
1981 - Collected 6 wins for the Florida State League Northern Division champions, Tampa Tarpons.
1983 - Led Cedar Rapids Reds in strikeouts on the way to being Central Division champs.
1984 - Led the Eastern League in saves and captured the win in the championship game for the Eastern League title. Murphy was named Vermont Reds' Fireman of the Year.
1985 - Led the Denver Zephyrs in ERA on their way to the Western Division title of the American Association.

Cincinnati Reds 1985-1988	
A hard fastball thrower with a sharp slider, Murphy had an inauspicious debut by giving up a 400-foot blast to the first Major League hitter he faced, Mike Marshall.  However, Murphy returned in his next outing with two shutout innings that suggested better things lie ahead.

In 1986, Rob brought all of his potential to the mound in what was an amazing season.  His final ERA in 1986 was 0.72.  In the history of Major League baseball, no pitcher who had pitched 50 innings or more had an ERA lower than Murphy’s.  His ERA record still stands in the National League, and has only been lowered by the great Dennis Eckersley, Fernando Rodney and Zach Britton in the American League.  That same season, his hits per nine inning ratio (4.65/9ip), had bested the previous National League records posted in 1972 and 1916.  When Rob retired in 1995, that hits per inning ratio still stood atop the NL record book.  In that memorable 1986 season, Murphy only gave up four doubles, and no triples or home runs.  That stingy season led to a Slugging Percentage of .179. That figure crushed the almost 20-year-old record of Ted Abernathy.  Murphy’s record stood for 17 years, and has only been surpassed by Eric Gagne and Craig Kimbrel.

In 1987, he followed with another superb year as the busiest left-handed reliever in major league history. His 87 relief appearances were the most ever by a lefty, as he pitched 100.2 innings and struck out 99 batters.  As of 2013, 87 appearances is still the most by a Reds left-handed reliever.
1988 saw Murphy lead the National League with 76 games pitched while pitching  innings. In four years with the Reds, Murphy had held 72 of the 78 leads he had been tasked with holding, and had stranded 79% of the runners he inherited.  After the season, he was traded to the Boston Red Sox.  
Comparing Murphy with all Cincinnati Reds’ pitchers that had pitched at least 200 innings, Murphy had these rankings in these categories when he had concluded his career with Cincinnati:

Category	Stat	Rank
ERA		2.60	15th
K/9		7.92       3rd
K/BB		2.26	10th
H/9		7.09	   3rd
SLG%		.306	2nd
Inh. Runners	21%	1st

In Boston in 1989, Murphy collected career-highs with nine saves and 105.0 innings pitched behind closer Lee Smith in the Boston bullpen.  Murphy’s 74 appearances eclipsed the team’s record for games pitched by a left-hander.  The previous record was held by Sparky Lyle.  His 105 innings pitched was also the most by a Red Sox left hander, strictly in relief, and the last time a left-handed pitcher threw over 100 innings, strictly in relief, in the American League.   By pitching over 100 relief innings in both the American and National Leagues, Murphy joined a very short list of lefties to accomplish this feat.  Only Darold Knowles and Ron Perranoski had done this before, both in 1970.  Rob was named the Red Sox Fireman of the Year (best reliever) by the Boston area Baseball Writers.

1990 saw Murphy set a record for consecutive errorless games at start of career (332), previous record (175).  The Red Sox won the Eastern Division of the American League.

In 1992, Rob set a dubious record for consecutive games without a win (146).

Murphy also pitched for the Mariners, Cardinals, Yankees, Dodgers and Marlins, retiring at the end of the 1995 season.

In an eleven-season career, Murphy, compiled a 32–38 record with thirty saves and a 3.64 ERA in 597 games.  At his retirement, he ranked eighteenth in the history of baseball for left-handed relief appearances, and had played longer in the Major Leagues than any player in University of Florida history.

See also 

 Florida Gators
 List of Florida Gators baseball players

References

Bibliography 

Gary Gillette, Peter Gammons, Pete Palmer, The ESPN Baseball Encyclopedia, Sterling Publishing (2005).  .

External links

1960 births
Living people
Baseball players from Miami
Boston Red Sox players
Cedar Rapids Reds players
Charlotte Knights players
Cincinnati Reds players
Denver Zephyrs players
Florida Gators baseball players
Florida Marlins players
Houston Astros players
Los Angeles Dodgers players
Major League Baseball pitchers
New York Yankees players
Seattle Mariners players
St. Louis Cardinals players
Tampa Tarpons (1957–1987) players
Vermont Reds players
Christopher Columbus High School (Miami-Dade County, Florida) alumni